SMS Grosser Kurfürst  (or Großer ) was an ironclad turret ship built for the German Kaiserliche Marine (Imperial Navy). She was laid down at the Imperial Dockyard in Wilhelmshaven in 1870 and completed in 1878; her long construction time was in part due to a redesign that was completed after work on the ship had begun. Her main battery of four  guns was initially to be placed in a central armored battery, but during the redesign, this was altered to a pair of twin gun turrets amidships.

Grosser Kurfürst was sunk on her maiden voyage when she was accidentally rammed by the ironclad . The three ships encountered a group of fishing boats under sail; in turning to avoid them, Grosser Kurfürst inadvertently crossed König Wilhelms path and was rammed, sinking within about eight minutes. Between 269 and 284 of her crew drowned. Her loss spurred a series of investigations into the circumstances of the collision, which ultimately resulted in the acquittal of both Rear Admiral , the squadron commander, and Count Alexander von Monts, the captain of Grosser Kurfürst. Political infighting over the affair led to the ousting of Rear Admiral Reinhold von Werner from the navy.

Design 

Initially ordered as casemate ships, the vessels were re-designed as turret ships; they were the first uniform class of ironclads built for the German fleet.

The ship was powered by one 3-cylinder single-expansion steam engine, which drove a single screw propeller. Steam was supplied by six coal-fired transverse trunk boilers, which were vented into a single funnel. She was also equipped with a full ship rig of sails. Her standard complement was 46 officers and 454 enlisted men.

She was armed with a main battery of four  L/22 guns mounted in a pair of turrets placed on the centerline amidships. As built, the ship was also equipped with two  L/25 guns as chase guns, one in the bow and one in the stern. Grosser Kurfürsts armor was made of wrought iron backed with teak. The armored belt was arrayed in two strakes. The gun turrets were protected by  armor on the sides, backed by 260 mm of teak.

Service history 
Grosser Kurfürst was ordered by the Imperial Navy from the Imperial Dockyard in Wilhelmshaven; her keel was laid down in 1869 under construction number 2. The ship was launched on 17 September 1875 and was commissioned into the German fleet on 6 May 1878. Grosser Kurfürst cost the German government 7,303,000 gold marks. As originally designed, Grosser Kurfürst was to have had her primary armament arranged in a central battery; after she was laid down, she was altered to mount her main guns in a pair of twin turrets. Although she was the first ship in her class of three vessels to be laid down, she was the last to be launched and commissioned, because she was redesigned after work had begun, and she was built by the newly established Imperial Dockyard.

Collision and loss 

In April 1878, the armored squadron was reactivated for the annual summer training cycle, under the command of Konteradmiral Carl Ferdinand Batsch. Grosser Kurfürst joined the unit, which included her sisters Preussen and Friedrich der Grosse and the large ironclad , after her commissioning on 6 May. A grounding by Friedrich der Grosse caused serious damage to her hull and prevented her from taking part in the upcoming training cruise. The three ships left Wilhelmshaven on the 29th. König Wilhelm and Preussen steamed in a line, with Grosser Kurfürst off to starboard. On the morning of the 31st, the three ships encountered a pair of sailing vessels off Folkestone. Grosser Kurfürst turned to port to avoid the boats while König Wilhelm sought to pass the two boats, but there was not enough distance between her and Grosser Kurfürst. She, therefore, turned hard to port to avoid Grosser Kurfürst, but not quickly enough, and König Wilhelm found herself pointed directly at Grosser Kurfürst; her ram bow tore a large hole in Grosser Kurfürsts side.

Grosser Kurfürsts watertight bulkheads were not adequately sealed, and she sank within about eight minutes. Figures for the number of fatalities vary. Erich Gröner reports that out of a crew of 500 men, 269 died in the accident, Lawrence Sondhaus states that 276 men were killed, and Aidan Dodson reports 284 fatalities. Many of the bodies were ultimately buried in Cheriton Road Cemetery, Folkestone, where there is a substantial memorial. Arthur Sullivan, on his way to Paris, witnessed the incident, writing, "I saw it all – saw the unfortunate vessel slowly go over and disappear under the water in clear, bright sunshine, and the water like a calm lake.  It was too horrible – and then we saw all the boats moving about picking up the survivors, some so exhausted they had to be lifted on to the ships." Among those rescued was the ship's captain, Count Alexander von Monts.

König Wilhelm was badly damaged in the collision, with severe flooding forward. König Wilhelms captain initially intended to  beach the ship to prevent it from sinking, but determined that the ship's pumps could hold the flooding to an acceptable level. The ship made for Portsmouth, where temporary repairs could be effected to allow the ship to return to Germany. In the aftermath of the collision, the German navy held a court martial for Batsch, the squadron commander, and Captains Monts and Kuehne, the commanders of the two ships, along with Lieutenant Clausa, the first officer aboard Grosser Kurfürst, to investigate the sinking.

Inquiry 

In the ensuing inquiry, chaired by Konteradmiral Reinhold von Werner, Monts testified that he had not been given sufficient time to familiarize himself with the ship and its crew, who were themselves unfamiliar with the vessel. Monts argued that the mobilization process for the newly commissioned ship should have lasted four to six weeks, rather than the three he had been given. The day before the squadron left Wilhelmshaven, Batsch complained to General Albrecht von Stosch, the chief of the Kaiserliche Marine, that a significant number of dockyard workers were still finishing work on Grosser Kurfürst. Werner and the board determined that Batsch was at fault and exonerated Monts.

Stosch was infuriated that the proceedings had been allowed to become a forum for criticism of his policies, for which he blamed Werner. He appealed to Kaiser Wilhelm I, stating that the inquiry had unfairly blamed Batsch, and requested a new court-martial for the involved officers. Simultaneously, Stosch began a campaign to force Werner out of the navy. This was in part to ensure that Batsch, his protégé, would be next in line after Stosch retired. Despite his popularity, particularly with Kaiser Wilhelm I and his son, Werner was unable to resist Stosch's efforts to force his ouster. On 15 October 1878, he requested retirement.

The second court-martial again found Batsch guilty and Monts innocent of negligence. A third investigation, held in January 1879, reversed the decision of the previous verdicts and sentenced Monts to a prison term of one month and two days, though the Kaiser refused to implement the punishment. This necessitated another trial, which returned to the initial verdict and sentenced Batsch to six months in prison. The Kaiser commuted Batsch's sentence after he had served two months. Disappointed that his protégé had taken the blame for the sinking, Stosch requested another court-martial for Monts, who was found not guilty. The Kaiser officially approved the verdict, which put an end to the series of trials over the sinking of Grosser Kurfürst.

Another consequence of the sinking was to instill an aversion to naval expenditures in the German  that persisted for many years. Among the effects of this reluctance to spend on the navy was the refusal to authorize funding for new capital ships for most of the 1880s.

The lives lost in the sinking of the Grosser Kurfürst are commemorated by a large stone obelisk erected at Cheriton Road Cemetery, in Folkestone. The Germans repeatedly considered projects to salvage the wreck until 1903. In 2020, it was announced by Historic England that the memorial would be listed as a Grade II listed building, and the wreck itself would be scheduled under the Ancient Monuments and Archaeological Areas Act 1979, allowing recreational diving under license but prohibiting salvage or removal of artifacts.

Footnotes

Notes

Citations

References 

 
 
 
 
 
 
 
 

Preussen-class ironclads
Shipwrecks in the English Channel
Maritime incidents in May 1878
1875 ships
Ships sunk in collisions
Ships built in Wilhelmshaven
Maritime disasters in Kent